Songbirds Guitar Museum is a museum which features guitars and it is located in Chattanooga, Tennessee. The museum was opened in 2018 as a for profit business: it closed in 2020. The museum reopened as a Nonprofit organization in September 2021 and was rebranded the Songbirds Guitar & Pop Culture Museum.

History

2018–2020
The museum opened in 2018 in Terminal Station (Chattanooga, Tennessee) which was originally opened in 1909 and saw the arrival of dozens of trains per day prior to WWII. The curator was guitar collector David Davidson who collected rare guitars. The museum displays vintage and celebrity guitars, and they host live music events. The museum had 1,500 guitars and many were rare and valuable. The museum had two Gibson Explorers worth one million dollars each. They also had 36 1958-1960 Sunburst Les Paul guitars worth $250,000 to $500,000 each. 

The for profit museum closed during the summer of 2020. It was called "a victim of the pandemic" and a documentary about the museum's closing. The documentary was created by Dagan Becket and it won an Emmy Award in March 2022.

Songbirds Guitar & Pop Culture Museum
The museum was reopened in 2021 as a non-profit led by Executive Director Reed Caldwell. The Songbirds museum is now a music venue and museum which displays about 550 guitars. The museum was rebranded as the Songbirds Guitar & Pop Culture Museum.

References

External links
Video - Songbirds Guitar Museum - Tennessee Crossroads 

Musical instrument museums in the United States
2018 establishments in the United States